Ammar al-Basri was a 9th-century East Syriac theologian and apologist. Ammar's work is considered the first systematic Christian theology in Arabic.
Not much is known about his life except that he was a native of Basra.

Works 
Several books two of them survived:
 The book of proof (، ), which deals with the incarnation in a popular albeit creative and vigorous language.
 The book of questions and answers, is more systematic and in treats in four sections questions regarding the existence of God, the Incarnation, the four Gospels and other topics.

See also 
Abu Raita al-Takriti
Theodore Abu-Qurrah

Notes

References 

Christian apologists
9th-century philosophers
9th-century Christian clergy
People from Basra
Members of the Assyrian Church of the East
Iraqi Christians
845 deaths